Pastiche is a literary or other artistic genre.

Pastiche may also refer to:
 Pastiche (album), a 1978 album by The Manhattan Transfer
 Pastiche (band), a British jazz vocal trio, best known for the theme song of Sonic the Hedgehog CD in the American soundtrack
 Pastiche, a fictional language in The Languages of Pao
 Nut roll